Malekan County is in East Azerbaijan province, Iran. The capital of the county is Malekan. At the 2006 census, the county's population was 100,366 in 24,823 households. The following census in 2011 counted 106,118 people in 29,686 households. At the 2016 census, the county's population was 111,319 in 33,598 households. The county is one of the most productive regions for grapes in Iran.

Etymology

The word Malekan is derived from Malek Kandi, "the village of the king." However, there are various theories pertaining to the origin of the name "Malekan Kandi." The first theory is that because the grounds are owned by "GAJAR" government, the city has been named after the founder and the king of the government.
The second theory holds that because there have been several kings that have come and gone in the past, it has been named this way.
The third and the last theory is that the name Malek Kandi is derived from the name of a king named Maleknia.

Administrative divisions

The population history and structural changes of Malekan County's administrative divisions over three consecutive censuses are shown in the following table. The latest census shows two districts, five rural districts, and three cities.

References

 

Counties of East Azerbaijan Province